Ophisops is a genus of wall lizards of the family Lacertidae. They are small lacertids characterized by transparent lower eyelids that are completely or partially fused with the upper lids to form a cap over the eye. Species of the genus Ophisops are distributed in southeast Europe, northeast Africa, to west Asia.

Species

The following 11 species are recognized:

Ophisops agarwali Patel & Vyas, 2020 - Agarwal’s snake-eye, Agarwal’s lacerta
Ophisops beddomei (Jerdon, 1870) - Beddome's snake-eye, Beddome’s lacerta
Ophisops elbaensis K.P. Schmidt & Marx, 1957 - Mount Elba snake-eyed lizard
Ophisops elegans Ménétries, 1832 - snake-eyed lizard
Ophisops jerdonii Blyth, 1853 - Jerdon's cabrita, Jerdon's snake-eye, Punjab snake-eyed lacerta
Ophisops kutchensis Agarwal, Khandekar, Ramakrishnan, Vyas, & Giri, 2018 - Kutch small-scaled snake-eye 
Ophisops leschenaultii (Milne-Edwards, 1829) - Leschenault's snake-eye, Leschenault’s lacerta, Leschenault's cabrita
Ophisops microlepis Blanford, 1870 - small-scaled lacerta 
Ophisops nictans Arnold, 1989 - lesser snake-eyed lacerta
Ophisops occidentalis Boulenger, 1887 - western snake-eyed lizard
Ophisops pushkarensis Agarwal, Khandekar, Ramakrishnan, Vyas, & Giri, 2018 - Pushkar small-scaled snake-eye

Nota bene: A binomial authority in parentheses indicates that the species was originally described in a genus other than Ophisops.

Notes

Further reading
Boulenger GA (1887). Catalogue of the Lizards in the British Museum (Natural History). Second Edition. Volume III. Lacertidæ, ... London: Trustees of the British Museum (Natural History). (Taylor and Francis, printers). xii + 575 pp. + Plates I-XL. (Genus "Ophiops [sic]", p. 72).
Ménétries É (1832). Catalogue raisonné des objets de zoologie recueillis dans un voyage au Caucase et jusqu'aux frontières actuelles de la Perse. Saint Petersburg: Russian Academy of Sciences. 330 pp. (Ophisops, new genus, p. 63). (in French).

 
Lizard genera
Taxa named by Édouard Ménétries